Billy Jack Goes to Washington is a 1977 American political drama film starring Tom Laughlin, the fourth  film in the Billy Jack series, and although the earlier films saw enormous success, this film did not.  The film only had limited screenings upon its release and never saw a general theatrical release, but has since become widely available on DVD. The film is a loose remake of the 1939 Frank Capra film Mr. Smith Goes to Washington, and is directed by Laughlin under the on-screen pseudonym "T.C. Frank".

Plot
Billy Jack (Tom Laughlin) is appointed a United States Senator to fill out the remaining term of another senator.  It is hoped that he will quietly vote the party line, but his term in the Senate runs into trouble when he proposes a bill to fund a national youth camp which happens to be on the property where a nuclear power plant is also being proposed.  His fellow senator, Joseph Paine (E. G. Marshall), claims to oppose nuclear power but is secretly taking graft to influence his votes in favor, and moves to try to keep Billy Jack out of the way when the bill is being debated.

Seeking to keep Billy out of the Senate on a day when a controversial energy bill is being voted on, Senator Paine suggests he should meet with a grassroots group that day instead. The group is working to pass a national initiative and Billy Jack becomes convinced of their cause.

Billy is invited to meet with a group of lobbyists attempting to offer him bribes and other perks if he will vote their way. Up against a man named Bailey (Sam Wanamaker) who wields a powerful influence in his home state, Billy Jack has his political career and reputation at stake if he does not cooperate. Billy responds with anger at their threat.

The next day in the Senate, he tries to speak on the floor in opposition to the nuclear power plant. Paine responds by proposing to expel Billy from the Senate as unfit for office. Billy's assistant quits after the murder of a lobbyist, fearing for her own safety, but returns after Billy Jack is about to be expelled from the Senate, to help him learn Senate procedure in order to filibuster.  Billy collapses on the Senate floor in the effort, whereupon Paine confesses to his colleagues that every word Billy spoke was the truth.

Cast 
 Tom Laughlin as Billy Jack
 E. G. Marshall as Senator Joseph Paine
 John Lawlor as Dan McArthur
 Lucie Arnaz as Saunders
 Delores Taylor as Jean
 Suzanne Somers as Sue
 Sam Wanamaker as Bailey
 Richard Sanders as Jerry
 Peter Donat as Ralph Butler
 Pat O'Brien as The Vice President

Production 

As with the two previous films in the series, Laughlin's wife Delores Taylor and daughter Teresa Laughlin reprise their roles. Julie Webb and several other supporting actors from Billy Jack and The Trial of Billy Jack return as well. Author and political journalist Joe Klein appears briefly as a reporter in the opening scene. (Klein became friends with Laughlin after interviewing him for Rolling Stone in 1975.) 

A new version of the song "One Tin Soldier" (the original theme for Billy Jack) sung by Teresa Laughlin is played over the closing credits.

Release 
Billy Jack Goes to Washington was a failure, partly due to distribution problems, and it proved to be Laughlin's last film as a director.

Scenes featuring Suzanne Somers and William Wellman Jr. were cut from the DVD release, which is missing 40 minutes. Wellman's cut scenes had him reprising the national guardsman he played in The Trial of Billy Jack, who was now on the board of the Freedom School's directors.

Reception
Variety wrote, "By comparison with the spine-tingling emotionalism and technical brilliance of the Capra version, the pic is much flatter and largely devoid of performing or visual nuances. Most of the humor is gone, and the characters are thinned out, replaced with a rhetorical talkathon interspersed with a few chopsocky sequences." Gary Arnold of The Washington Post described the film as "a talky, static, derivative picture that seems to run on forever," adding, "Laughlin relies so heavily on the original plot and dialogue of 'Mr. Smith Goes to Washington' that one may feel a little embarrassed on his behalf. It's obvious that he's used the Capra film as a crutch rather than an inspiration."

The film has a score of 0% on Rotten Tomatoes based on eight reviews, with an average grade of 2.71 out of 10.

Sequel 

The unfinished sequel to this movie is The Return of Billy Jack (1985/86).

References

External links
 Laughlin's official Billy Jack web site
 
 
 
 

1977 films
1970s political drama films
Remakes of American films
American political drama films
American sequel films
1970s English-language films
Films scored by Elmer Bernstein
Films about Native Americans
Films directed by Tom Laughlin
Films set in Washington, D.C.
1977 drama films
1970s American films